Ardnagrask is a rural area near to Muir of Ord in Highland, Scotland.

References

Populated places in Inverness committee area